Byron House School was an independent preparatory school in Highgate, London.

History 
Byron House was founded in 1897 as a progressive prep school "favoured by London's intelligentsia and famous for its advanced teaching methods". Stephen Hawking, while attending the school, complained to his parents that he "wasn't learning anything", and later blamed its teaching methods for his failure to learn to read "until the fairly late age of eight". Another former pupil, Sir James Lighthill was the Lucasian Professor of Mathematics directly before Hawking.

In 1939, pupils were evacuated to Cambridge and between 1940 and 1944, 24 children from Byron House were evacuated to Ottawa, Canada.

John Betjeman was taught by T. S. Eliot at Byron House, before being sent to the Dragon School in Oxford.

Notable former pupils 

 Elizabeth Taylor, actress
 John Betjeman, writer and poet 
 Stephen Hawking, physicist 
 Maurice Hill, geophysicist attended briefly before Highgate School 
Anne Atkins, broadcaster 
 Henry Fairly, journalist
 James Lighthill, mathematician
 Gregory Tesser, sports journalist
 Charles Gidley Wheeler, novelist

References 

Educational institutions established in 1897
Highgate
Grade II* listed buildings in the London Borough of Haringey
Defunct schools in the London Borough of Haringey
1897 establishments in England